Dieter Dolezel (born 28 July 1977) is a German composer and electronic guitarist.

Life 
Dolezel was born in Munich. This was followed by composition studies with Wilfried Hiller and Louis Andriessen as well as various master classes with Tristan Murail, Alvin Curran and Richard Ayres, among others. In 2002, he founded the doArte Foundation, for which he is still active in an advisory capacity.

Performances of his works have taken place at the Gaudeamus Foundation Music Week, the Hamburg Klangwerktage, novembermusic, at the Prinzregententheater in Munich and at the Auditorium Parco della Musica Santa Cecilia in Rome. Among the performers of his music are the Ensemble Modern, the King's Singers, Mike Svoboda, John Snijders, the Holland Symfonia, Fabrice Bollon, as well as the ensemble unitedberlin. In 2007, he was a scholarship holder at the Villa Massimo in Rome.

Work 
Orchestra
 aber vielleicht (2006)
 aber vielleicht for 20 strings (2004)

Chamber music
 realtime fragments for string quartet (2006)
 pLasTik for flute, bassoon, percussion (2), viola, cello and double bass (2005)
 fanfare 2003 for 4 trumpets, 4 trombones and percussion (2002), official fanfare for the 100th anniversary of the Deutsches Museum Munich.
 blacheriana I-III for saxophone quartet (2001/02)

Electroacoustics
 bugs for flute, double bass clarinet, piano, violin, viola, cello, double bass and electronics (2007/08)
 wildes FLEISCH II for trombone and soundtrack (2007)
 chasing dion tiu video installation (2007)
 hoax for three pianists, one piano and soundtrack (2005)
 babenberg for 5 electric guitars and electronics (2003)

Vocal
 serve bone et fidelis for 6-part choir a cappella (2008)
 may contain traces of for 4 voices and big band (2005)
 dogs and stones for 6 male voices (2004)

 Awards 
Source:
 2001 Richard Strauss-Scholarship of the City of Munich
 2002 1st prize in the competition "Fanfare Deutsches Museum 2003"
 2003/2004 Fellowship at "Internationales Künstlerhaus Villa Concordia" in Bamberg
 2005 11th International Young Composers Meeting in Apeldoorn
 2005 Musikstipendium by the city of Munich
 2006 Sudetendeutscher Kulturförderpreis
 2006 Prize winner at the 1st International Composition Competition of the Hamburger Klangwerktage 2007 1st prize in the competition Project Young Composers of the Holland Symfonia
 2007 Gaudeamus Foundation audience prize
 2007 Scholarship holder of the Villa Massimo in Rome
 2009 Laureate at "Neue Töne" competition, Tonkünstlerverband
 2013 Projektstipendium Junge Kunst / Neue Medien of the City of Munich.

 Recordings 
 Otto von Bamberg, Schola Bamberg (2010), issued by Christophorus Records, (CHR77324)
 Edition Villa Massimo, Ensemble Modern (2008)
 Diario, Susanne Schoeppe, guitar (2004), issued by GENUIN, (GMP 04501)
 9 Fanfaren'', Blechbläserensemble des RSK, erschienen im Jubiläums-Bildband des Deutsches Museum Munich (2004)

References

External links 
 
 

20th-century German composers
German guitarists
1977 births
Living people
Musicians from Munich